Nationality words link to articles with information on the nation's poetry or literature (for instance, Irish or France).

Events

Works published
 Alexander Barclay, The Mirror of Good Manners, publication year uncertain, translated from Dominic Mancini's De quatuor virtutibus, in English and Latin; London: Richard Pynson
 Hans Sachs, die Wittenbergische Nachtigall, allegorical story in verse in praise of Luther
 John Skelton, The Garland of Laurel

Births
Death years link to the corresponding "[year] in poetry" article:
 February 20 – Jan Blahoslav (died 1571), Czech poet and translator
 Approximate date – Girolamo Maggi (died 1572), Italian scholar, jurist, poet, military engineer, urban planner, philologist, archaeologist, mathematician and naturalist

Deaths
Birth years link to the corresponding "[year] in poetry" article:
 Stephen Hawes, death year uncertain, birth year unknown; English
 Ulrich von Hutten (born 1488), German
 Faustino Perisauli (born 1450), Italian, Latin-language poet
 Tang Yin died this year, according to some sources, or 1524 according to others (born 1470), Chinese poet, painter and calligrapher

See also

 Poetry
 16th century in poetry
 16th century in literature
 French Renaissance literature
 Renaissance literature
 Spanish Renaissance literature

Notes

16th-century poetry
Poetry